Hatfield is an unincorporated community in Pike County, Kentucky, United States.

A post office was established in the community in 1903, and named for its first postmaster, James F. Hatfield. The post office closed in 1925.

References

Unincorporated communities in Pike County, Kentucky
Unincorporated communities in Kentucky